Issah Yakubu (born 17 December 1992) is a Ghanaian professional footballer who plays as a midfielder for  club Ahed.

Career

Ghana and Libya 
Starting his senior career in 2010 at Liberty Professionals, Yakubu joined Asante Kotoko in 2012, before moving to Libyan side Al-Nasr the following year on a free transfer. In September 2014, Yakubu moved back to his native Ghana at BA Stars on loan, before ending the season at Inter Allies on another loan in 2015; he played 14 games and scored once in the Ghana Premier League for the side.

Lebanon 
On 28 September 2015, Yakubu moved to Lebanon, joining Nabi Chit on a two-year contract, with whom he played 21 games and scored four in the league.

The following season, he moved to Shabab Sahel where he scored twice in 19 league games. Ahed signed Yakubu in 2017 on a two-year deal.

On 4 November 2019, Yakubu scored a header against North Korean side April 25 in the 2019 AFC Cup Final; the match ended in a 1–0 win, as he helped his side become the first Lebanese side to win the competition. He was nominated Man of the Match for his performance.

Al-Arabi and Fujairah 
On 21 January 2020, Yakubu was sent on a six-month loan to Kuwaiti side Al-Arabi. In August 2020, Yakubu moved to Al-Arabi permanently in a deal worth $USD100,000.

On 19 September 2021, Yakubu joined Fujairah FC in the UAE First Division League.

Return to Ahed 
In December 2022, Yakubu returned to Ahed ahead of the second half of the 2022–23 Lebanese Premier League.

Honours 
Asante Kotoko
 Ghana Premier League: 2012–13
 Ghana Super Cup: 2012

Ahed
 AFC Cup: 2019
 Lebanese Premier League: 2017–18, 2018–19
 Lebanese FA Cup: 2017–18, 2018–19
 Lebanese Super Cup: 2017, 2018, 2019

Individual
 Lebanese Premier League Best Foreign Player: 2017–18
 Lebanese Premier League Team of the Season: 2017–18, 2018–19

References

External links 

 
 
 

1992 births
Living people
Association football midfielders
Ghanaian footballers
Liberty Professionals F.C. players
Asante Kotoko S.C. players
Al-Nasr SC (Benghazi) players
BA Stars F.C. players
International Allies F.C. players
Al Nabi Chit SC players
Shabab Al Sahel FC players
Al Ahed FC players
Al-Arabi SC (Kuwait) players
Fujairah FC players
Ghana Premier League players
Libyan Premier League players
Lebanese Premier League players
Kuwait Premier League players
UAE First Division League players
AFC Cup winning players
Ghanaian expatriate footballers
Ghanaian expatriate sportspeople in Lebanon
Ghanaian expatriate sportspeople in Libya
Ghanaian expatriate sportspeople in Kuwait
Ghanaian expatriate sportspeople in the United Arab Emirates
Expatriate footballers in Lebanon
Expatriate footballers in Libya
Expatriate footballers in Kuwait
Expatriate footballers in the United Arab Emirates